Franz Antoine (23 February 1815 in the  on the Löwelbastei, Vienna – 11 March 1886) was an Austrian horticulturalist and gardener. 

From 1865 he was director of royal gardens to the Austrian/Austro-Hungarian monarchy. He was an authority on the botanical family Bromeliaceae, and was also an avid photographer. His photographs of still lifes, plants and scenes of Vienna were presented at exhibitions in Vienna (1864, 1873) and Paris (1867). Among his written works were the following:
 Die Coniferen, (The conifers), (1840-1847). 
 Der Wintergarten der K.K. Hofburg zu Wien, (The Winter Garden at the Hofburg Imperial Palace in Vienna), (1852). 
 Coniferen des Cilicischen Taurus, (Conifers of Cilician Taurus) – with Theodor Kotschy, (1855). 
 Phyto-Iconography der Bromeliaceen, (Photo-iconography of bromeliads), (1884).

His father, Franz Antoine the Elder (1768-1834), was also a gardener to Austrian royalty, with a gardener's residencethe younger Franz' birthplacein the  garden, now part of the Volksgarten, Vienna.

References 

19th-century Austrian botanists
Austrian gardeners
People from Innere Stadt
1815 births
1886 deaths